The Men's 3 m synchro springboard competition of the 2018 European Aquatics Championships was held on 10 August 2018.

Results
The final was started at 13:30.

References

Men's 3 m synchro springboard